Spivey Hall was built in 1991 on the campus of Clayton State University in Morrow, Georgia, near Atlanta, Georgia.  Its seating capacity is 492 (476 in the orchestra and 16 box seats). It presents jazz and classical music to the metro Atlanta area.

Spivey Hall is home to the Spivey Hall Children's Choir and Spivey Hall Young Artists. The Children's Concert Series won the Abby Award for arts education in Atlanta in 1998.

The Hall was the inspiration of Emilie Parmalee Spivey and Walter Boone Spivey, a wealthy real estate developer couple in the Atlanta area. The Walter & Emilie Spivey Foundation donated $2.5 million to the construction which began in November 1988 (total cost $4.5 million). Though intimately involved in the planning, Walter had died by the time of the groundbreaking, and Emilie died soon thereafter.

The visual centerpiece of Spivey's design is the Albert Schweitzer Memorial Organ, a 79-rank, 3-manual, 4,413-pipe organ, built and installed by Fratelli Ruffatti of Padua, Italy.  The creation of this organ was the subject of a PBS special. The majority of Spivey's finishes were designed to be acoustically reflective, in an effort to preserve the sound within and prolong its reverberation.

Owing to frequent appearances on National Public Radio's "Performance Today," the hall has earned a national reputation while also reaching an international audience through artist word-of-mouth and exposure in such publications as BBC Music Magazine and International Arts Manager.

See also

 List of concert halls

References

External links

 

Buildings and structures in Clayton County, Georgia
Clayton State University
Music venues in Georgia (U.S. state)
Tourist attractions in Clayton County, Georgia
Music venues completed in 1991
University and college arts centers in the United States
1991 establishments in Georgia (U.S. state)